Tadashi Horikoshi (堀越 信司, Horikoshi Tadashi, born 19 July 1988) is a Japanese Paralympic athlete. He won the bronze medal in the men's marathon T12 event at the 2020 Summer Paralympics held in Tokyo, Japan. He also competed at the Summer Paralympics in 2008, 2012 and 2016.

He won bronze medals at both the 2017 and 2019 World Para Athletics Marathon Championships in London. Domestically, he represents the NTT West Japan track and field team.

References

Living people
1988 births
People from Nagano (city)
Paralympic medalists in athletics (track and field)
Athletes (track and field) at the 2008 Summer Paralympics
Athletes (track and field) at the 2012 Summer Paralympics
Athletes (track and field) at the 2016 Summer Paralympics
Athletes (track and field) at the 2020 Summer Paralympics
Medalists at the 2020 Summer Paralympics
Paralympic bronze medalists for Japan
Paralympic athletes of Japan
Japanese male marathon runners
21st-century Japanese people